The 2012–13 Kategoria Superiore was the 74th official season, or 77th season of top-tier football in Albania (including three unofficial championships of the World War II) and the fifteenth season under the name Kategoria superiore. The season began on 25 August 2012 and ended on 11 May 2013. Skënderbeu Korçë were the defending champions retained their title, winning their fourth Albanian league championship.

Promotion and relegation 
Pogradeci and Dinamo Tirana were directly relegated to the Kategoria e Parë after finishing 13th and 14th in the previous year's standings. They are replaced by Kategoria e Parë champions Luftëtari Gjirokastër and runners-up Kukësi.

The 10th placed Tomori Berat, 11th placed Kamza and 12th placed Apolonia Fier had to compete in single-match relegation play-offs. Kamza were relegated after were lost 2–0 against Kategoria e Parë fourth-placed club Besa Kavajë, while Tomori and Apolonia Fier were retained their place in the league. Tomori won the match against Kategoria e Parë fifth-placed club Besëlidhja Lezhë after a penalty shoot-out and Apolonia Fier were defeated a Kategoria e Parë third-placed club Lushnja 3–0.

Teams

Stadia and last season

League table

Results

Positions by round

Season statistics

Top scorers

Hat-tricks

Awards

Monthly awards

References

External links
 

2012-123
Alb
1